Egon Dyg (5 February 1927 – 3 October 2013) was a Danish sprint canoeist who competed in the early 1950s. He finished ninth in the K-2 1000 m event at the 1952 Summer Olympics in Helsinki.

References

Egon Dyg's profile at Sports Reference.com
Ego Dyg's obituary 

1927 births
2013 deaths
Canoeists at the 1952 Summer Olympics
Danish male canoeists
Olympic canoeists of Denmark